Philip or Phil May may refer to:
Phil May (caricaturist) (1864–1903), English caricaturist
Phil May (cricketer) or Percy May (1884–1965), English cricketer
Phil May (singer) (1944–2020), English vocalist
Phil May (athlete) (1944–2014), Australian Olympic athlete
Philip May (born 1957), British investment relationship manager, husband of former British prime minister Theresa May